Dorcadion nigrostriatum is a species of beetle in the family Cerambycidae. It was described by Adlbauer in 1982. It is known from Turkey.

References

nigrostriatum
Beetles described in 1982